Towson University's College of Health Professions has the departments of:

Audiology
Speech-Language Pathology and Deaf Studies
Health Science
Kinesiology
Nursing
Occupational Therapy and Occupational science.

The college also offers programs in allied health and gerontology. The college enrolls more students in bachelor's and master's level health care and sport-related programs and produces more physical education and sports related teachers than any other institution in Maryland. The college is also noted for its combined B.S./M.S. program in occupational therapy and applied doctoral programs in audiology and occupational science.

External links

College of Health Professions - Towson University Website

Health Professions